Gunnar Dahlgaard (born 27 April 1941) is a Danish sailor. He competed in the Dragon event at the 1972 Summer Olympics.

References

External links
 

1941 births
Living people
Danish male sailors (sport)
Olympic sailors of Denmark
Sailors at the 1972 Summer Olympics – Dragon
Sportspeople from Frederiksberg